The 2022 Ladies European Tour was a series of golf tournaments for elite female golfers from around the world. The tournaments were sanctioned by the Ladies European Tour (LET).

Schedule
The table below shows the 2022 schedule. The season featured 34 events in 22 countries and a total purse of around €29 million, the greatest number of tournaments and prize money in the tour's 44-year history.

The numbers in brackets after the winners' names indicate the career wins on the Ladies European Tour, including that event, and is only shown for members of the tour.

Key

Unofficial events
The following events appear on the schedule, but does not carry ranking points.

Order of Merit rankings
The top 10 players in the Race to Costa del Sol Rankings.

Source:

See also
2022 LPGA Tour

References

External links
Official site of the Ladies European Tour
2022 Ladies European Tour Tournaments

2022
2022 in women's golf
2022 in European sport